Pope Innocent may refer to:
 Pope Innocent I (401–417)
 Pope Innocent II (1130–1143)
 Pope Innocent III (1198–1216)
 Pope Innocent IV (1243–1254)
 Pope Innocent V (1276)
 Pope Innocent VI (1352–1362)
 Pope Innocent VII (1404–1406)
 Pope Innocent VIII (1484–1492)
 Pope Innocent IX (1591)
 Pope Innocent X (1644–1655)
 Pope Innocent XI (1676–1689)
 Pope Innocent XII (1691–1700)
 Pope Innocent XIII (1721–1724)

Additionally, one antipope has chosen the name Innocent:

 Antipope Innocent III (1179–1180)

Innocent